Greenville is a village and census-designated place (CDP) in the town of Smithfield in Providence County, Rhode Island, United States. The population was 8,658 at the 2010 census. The CDP is centered on the village of Greenville but also encompasses the nearby villages of West Greenville and Spragueville, as well as the Mountaindale Reservoir and beach.

The village of Greenville is named after Revolutionary War general Nathanael Greene, who was born in Rhode Island in 1742. The location, however, was first settled in the 17th century. The village contains the Greenville Baptist Church (American Baptist Churches, USA), Greenville Public Library, and William Winsor School, and there are many apple orchards in the surrounding area. The area was active in the Free Will Baptist movement in the 19th century, and the Smithville Seminary, a Free Baptist institution, was nearby. U.S. Route 44, known locally as "Putnam Pike", runs through the center of Greenville.

Notable residents
 Arthur Steere (1865–1943), senator, businessman
 John Steere (1634–1724), early settler, farmer
 Thomas Angell (professor), Baptist scholar at Bates College
 William Winsor (1819-1904), philanthropist, supporter of education
 Bernard Hawkins, American politician

Geography
Greenville is located at  (41.876749, −71.553375).

According to the United States Census Bureau, the CDP has a total area of 14.9 km2 (5.8 mi2). 13.5 km2 (5.2 mi2) of it is land and 1.4 km2 (0.5 mi2) of it (9.39%) is water. Some bodies of water in Greenville include Waterman Reservoir and Slack's Pond.

Distinct villages in Greenville CDP
 Greenville
 West Greenville
 Spragueville
 Mountaindale (also Mountain Dale) — the location of Mountaindale Beach. Mountaindale was home to the Mountain Dale Hosiery Mill owned by J.P. and J.G. Ray.

Climate

Demographics

As of the census of 2000, there were 8,626 people, 3,302 households, and 2,314 families residing in the CDP. The population density was 639.3/km2 (1,654.7/mi2). There were 3,418 housing units at an average density of 253.3/km2 (655.7/mi2). The racial makeup of the CDP was 98.47% White, 0.28% African American, 0.20% Native American, 0.51% Asian, 0.02% Pacific Islander, 0.06% from other races, and 0.46% from two or more races. Hispanic or Latino of any race were 0.58% of the population.

There were 3,302 households, out of which 30.0% had children under the age of 18 living with them, 59.3% were married couples living together, 7.9% had a female householder with no husband present, and 29.9% were non-families. 27.0% of all households were made up of individuals, and 17.1% had someone living alone who was 65 years of age or older. The average household size was 2.49 and the average family size was 3.05.

In the CDP, the population was spread out, with 21.7% under the age of 18, 5.4% from 18 to 24, 25.4% from 25 to 44, 25.2% from 45 to 64, and 22.3% who were 65 years of age or older. The median age was 44 years. For every 100 females, there were 86.2 males. For every 100 females age 18 and over, there were 80.1 males.

The median income for a household in the CDP was $56,036, and the median income for a family was $66,832. Males had a median income of $49,671 versus $31,545 for females. The per capita income for the CDP was $24,770. About 1.6% of families and 3.2% of the population were below the poverty line, including 1.7% of those under age 18 and 8.1% of those age 65 or over.

Notable sites and historic places in Greenville
 Saint Thomas Episcopal Church and Rectory (1852)
 Smithfield Exchange Bank (1822)
 Stephen Winsor House (1850)
 Waterman-Winsor Farm (1774)

Images

References

Census-designated places in Providence County, Rhode Island
Smithfield, Rhode Island
Villages in Providence County, Rhode Island
Providence metropolitan area
Villages in Rhode Island
Census-designated places in Rhode Island